SFK Vrchovina is a Czech football club located in the town of Nové Město na Moravě in the Vysočina Region. In the 2017–18 season the club was promoted from the Czech Fourth Division and currently plays in the Moravian–Silesian Football League, which is the third tier of the Czech football system.

Czech Cup
Vrchovina has taken part in the national cup a number of times, defeating Czech 2. Liga side FC Vysočina Jihlava and Moravian–Silesian Football League side SK Líšeň on the way to the third round of the 2010–11 Czech Cup.

References

External links
  

Football clubs in the Czech Republic
Association football clubs established in 1998
Žďár nad Sázavou District